HKM Rimavská Sobota is a professional Slovak ice hockey team playing in the Slovak Slovak 2. Liga. They play their games at Rimavská Sobota Ice Stadium in the Slovak town of Rimavská Sobota. The club was founded in 1995.

Honours

Domestic

Slovak 2. Liga
  Runners-up (2): 2011–12, 2018–19

References

External links
Official website 
 

Rimavská Sobota
Ice hockey clubs established in 1995